Johnny "Hammond" Cooks with Gator Tail is an album by jazz organist Johnny "Hammond" Smith and saxophonist Willis Jackson recorded for the Prestige label in 1962.

Reception

AllMusic writer Richie Unterberger awarded the album 3 stars and stating "This Smith/Jackson joint session is typical early-'60s Prestige soul-jazz, with all the good and bad that implies".

Track listing
All compositions by Johnny "Hammond" Smith except where noted.
 "Good 'Nuff"
 "Nobody Knows the Trouble I've Seen" (Traditional)
 "Sonja's Dreamland"
 "Bésame Mucho" (Sunny Skylar, Consuelo Velázquez)
 " Y'all" (Willis Jackson)
 "Neckbones"
 "Delicious"

Personnel
Johnny "Hammond" Smith – organ
Willis Jackson – tenor saxophone
Eddie McFadden – guitar
Leo Stevens – drums
 Esmond Edwards – producer
 Rudy Van Gelder – engineer

References

Johnny "Hammond" Smith albums
Willis Jackson (saxophonist) albums
1962 albums
Prestige Records albums
Albums produced by Esmond Edwards
Albums recorded at Van Gelder Studio